The 2021 Cup of China was scheduled to be the third event in the 2021–22 ISU Grand Prix of Figure Skating, a senior-level international invitational competition series. It was to be held at the Chongqing Huaxi Culture and Sports Center in Chongqing on November 5–7. Medals would have been awarded in the disciplines of men's singles, women's singles, pairs, and ice dance. Skaters would have earned points toward qualifying for the 2021–22 Grand Prix Final.

On August 16, 2021, the International Skating Union announced the cancellation of Cup of China, citing the limited number of international flights to China and strict COVID-19 pandemic restrictions. In an attempt to preserve the Grand Prix series, the ISU asked for other ISU members to apply as hosts on the originally scheduled dates. On August 27, the ISU announced the Gran Premio d'Italia as the replacement event.

Entries 
The International Skating Union announced the preliminary assignments on June 29, 2021.

References

External links 
 Cup of China at the International Skating Union

2021 Cup of China
2021 in figure skating
2021 in Chinese sport
November 2021 sports events in China
Figure skating events cancelled due to the COVID-19 pandemic